Prihodişte may refer to several villages in Romania:

 Prihodişte, a village in Boșorod Commune, Hunedoara County
 Prihodişte, a village in Vața de Jos Commune, Hunedoara County